Cheetah Math: Learning about Division from Baby Cheetahs is a math book published by Henry Holt and Co. in 2007. Cheetah Math was designed to help students understand division. Ann Whitehead Nagda wrote the book with the cooperation of the San Diego Zoo. The book follows the lives of two baby cheetahs, Majani and Kubali, and relates their story to the principles of division. Sally Woolsey called the book "well done" and it is a popular item in many elementary school libraries. Kirkus Reviews called the book "A great addition to both the math and wild-animal conservation bookshelves". The School Library Journal also gave a favorable review, saying Cheetah Math "is a wonderful cross-curricular book and an appealing way to introduce math".

Other books in the series 
 Panda Math: Learning about Subtraction from Hua Mei and Mei Sheng
 Tiger Math: Learning to Graph from a Baby Tiger
 Chimp Math: Learning about Time from a Baby Chimpanzee
 Polar Bear Math: Learning about Fractions from Klondike and Snow

References

2007 children's books
American children's books
American non-fiction books
Children's non-fiction books
Mathematics books
Zoology books
Fictional cheetahs
Novels about cats
Henry Holt and Company books